Younger And Younger is a 1993 American comedy film co-written and directed by Percy Adlon and starring Donald Sutherland, Brendan Fraser and Lolita Davidovich.

Synopsis
Jonathan Younger owns a self-storage facility, and runs it with his wife Penny, with who he has a strained relationship. One day Penny, a plain and skittish woman, is startled by a great deal of noise Jonathan makes with an organ and dies from a heart attack.

Jonathan's college-aged son Winston returns home for the funeral and to help run the family business. While they interact with a number of quirky customers, Jonathan is haunted by the spirit of his late wife, who becomes increasingly attractive to him with each ghostly apparition.

Cast
 Donald Sutherland as Jonathan Younger 
 Brendan Fraser as Winston Younger 
 Lolita Davidovich as Penny
 Sally Kellerman as ZigZag Lilian 
 Julie Delpy as Melodie
 Linda Hunt as Frances
 Pit Krüger as Roger
 Nicholas Gunn as Benjamin

Reception
The summary of Leonard Klady's favorable Variety review reads "The iconoclastic oeuvre of Percy Adlon provides another unusual human comedy in "Younger and Younger." Superficially a family drama of an errant, philandering father, the yarn spins out from its simple premise into fantasy, music, black comedy and innumerable offbeat digressions. It’s a mad, wild souffle served up by actors at the top of their form." Writing for Entertainment Weekly, Melissa Pierson differs: "When a film stuffed with this much talent goes straight to video, you might suspect something. And you’d be largely right. C- ."

Awards and nominations
Brussels International Fantastic Film Festival
Won, "Silver Raven Award" - Percy Adlon

Tokyo International Film Festival
Won, "Best Actress Award" - Lolita Davidovich

References

External links

1990s fantasy comedy-drama films
1990s romantic comedy-drama films
1993 comedy films
1993 drama films
1993 films
American fantasy comedy-drama films
American romantic comedy-drama films
1990s English-language films
English-language German films
Fictional married couples
Films directed by Percy Adlon
Films scored by Hans Zimmer
German romantic comedy-drama films
1990s American films
1990s German films